Dark Champions: Heroes of Vengeance is a 1993 role-playing game supplement published by Hero Games/Iron Crown Enterprises in 1993 for the superhero role-playing game Champions.

Contents
Dark Champions: Heroes of Vengeance is 205-page softcover book written by Steven S. Long, with cover art by Frank Cirocco, and Storn Cook, and illustrations by Dan Smith, and Greg Smith. Using the role-playing rules of Champions, this book focusses on vigilante-type street heroes who use their powers to assault or kill the "bad guys".

The book gives details of many "Heroes of Vengeance", but also outlines real-life criminal organizations such as the Mafia, Chinese tongs, and the yakuza.

The book also provides a short scenario involving a serial killer.

Reception
In the September 1993 edition of Dragon (Issue 197), Allen Varney "reluctantly" called this book "the best supplement the Champions game has seen in years." He complimented the writing of Steven Long, saying, "Some individual sections of this book represent the best of their type the Hero line has yet seen." But Varney was not happy about the moral ambiguity of the game, saying that the concept of vigilante violence "relies on the unspoken assumption that our society has already fallen apart, so we'd better start shooting people." Varney concluded by asking "Does Dark Champions succeed in capturing gritty street-level vigilante adventures in game terms? Yes, brilliantly, not only for the Champions game but for many modern-day RPGs. Should players refuse to play this kind of campaign? I can’t make that call. Do I think  Champions helps the super-hero gaming field? No, I absolutely do not. For those who disagree, this book gives excellent campaign value."

Reviews
Shadis (Issue 9 - Sep 1993)
White Wolf Magazine (Issue 37 - 1993)
Challenge #75 (1994)

References

Role-playing game books
Role-playing game supplements introduced in 1993